Viru Bog is a bog in Harju County, Estonia within Lahemaa National Park.

The area of the bog is 235 ha.

Thickness of peat layer is about 6 m.

References

Harju County
Bogs of Estonia